Tracey Elizabeth Anne Crouch  (born 24 July 1975) is a British politician who has served as the Member of Parliament (MP) for Chatham and Aylesford since 2010. A member of the Conservative Party, she gained the seat from Labour's Jonathan Shaw. Crouch was appointed as Minister for Sport, Civil Society and Loneliness in 2017, but resigned in 2018 due to a delay over the introduction of reduced limits on the stakes of fixed odds betting terminals.

Early life and career
Born in Ashford, Kent, Crouch was educated at Folkestone School for Girls and graduated from the University of Hull with a law and politics degree in 1996.

Crouch was a parliamentary researcher from 1996 to 1998 before working in PR for Harcourt Public Affairs from 1999 to 2000. She returned to Westminster and held posts as chief of staff to three shadow ministers, including the shadow Home Secretary between 2003 and 2005. Crouch was then employed by the Aviva insurance company where she was the head of public affairs between 2005 and 2010. Before becoming a minister, she coached a junior girls' football team.

Parliamentary career
Crouch was elected as the Conservative MP for Chatham and Aylesford with a majority of 6,069. She won with a 46.2% share of the vote – a swing of 9.4% to the Conservatives. The Daily Telegraph listed her as one of their "pragmatic, Eurosceptic" new MPs who seeks to "anchor the [Conservative] party to the right of centre". In 2014, Crouch described herself as a "compassionate, One-Nation Conservative".

Crouch is a vice-chair of the All Party Parliamentary Groups on dementia, alcohol misuse and athletics. In February 2011, Crouch was elected to the 1922 Committee executive.

On 9 December 2010, Crouch abstained in the vote to raise university tuition fees. She was one of two Conservative MPs to abstain, while six voted against the proposals. Crouch voted against the badger cull, speaking during the debates on the subject in October 2012 and June 2013. She congratulated other Conservative MPs for voting against or abstaining on the vote, describing the cull as "barbaric and indiscriminate". She has also rebelled against the government in voting against press regulation and in support of mesothelioma victims. She voted in favour of the Marriage (Same Sex Couples) Act 2013. Following the 2015 general election, when she retained her seat with a 50.2% vote share, she was made Minister for Sport on 12 May 2015.

Ahead of the 2016 referendum on the UK's continued membership of the European Union, Crouch stated that she had yet to decide. Subsequently, she chose to keep the way she had voted private "to avoid conflict in her Kent constituency".

As Minister for Civil Society, which was added to her existing ministerial brief in June 2017, she was, in January 2018, appointed to lead a government-wide group with responsibility for policies connected to loneliness.

She is an opponent of fox hunting, and is among those Conservative MPs who oppose relaxation of the Hunting Act 2004.

She resigned as a minister on 1 November 2018 over the delay in the reduction of the maximum stake for fixed odds betting terminals from £100 to £2. She, among others, had called for the new legislation to come into force in April 2019, with Crouch resigning when it was announced that the legislation would be delayed until October 2019. However, following parliamentary pressure, the Government announced that the measure would come into effect on 1 April 2019 after all.

Crouch initially backed Matt Hancock during the 2019 Conservative Party leadership election, but subsequently gave her support to Boris Johnson upon Hancock's withdrawal. She was offered a job in Johnson's cabinet, which she turned down due to family commitments.

In December 2019, Crouch proposed the loyal address to the Queen's Speech.

In April 2021, Crouch was appointed to chair a review of English football following the controversy over the proposed European Super League.

On 14 December 2021, Crouch broke the party whip to vote against elements of the government's 'Plan B' COVID-19 restrictions, including the introduction of vaccine passports and mandatory COVID-19 vaccination for NHS staff. However, she voted in favour of the expansion of rules requiring mandatory face coverings in public places.

Crouch was appointed Commander of the Order of the British Empire (CBE) in the 2022 Birthday Honours for parliamentary and public service.

Personal life
Crouch is a qualified FA football coach and manages a youth girls' football team. She is a keen Tottenham Hotspur fan.

Crouch had always wanted to be sports minister, but had a miscarriage during the 2015 general election campaign, leaving her initially uncertain as to whether to take up David Cameron's offer of the post. She gave birth to her first child in February 2016 with her partner Steve Ladner, and became the first Conservative minister ever to take maternity leave.

On 24 June 2020, it was announced that Crouch had been diagnosed with breast cancer but that her cancer was caught early and she had begun treatment. In February 2021, Crouch announced that she had completed her treatment.

References

External links
Tracey Crouch MP official constituency website
Tracey Crouch's blog
Tracy Crouch MP Conservative Party profile
Chatham and Aylesford Conservatives

1975 births
Living people
People educated at Folkestone School for Girls
Alumni of the University of Hull
Conservative Party (UK) MPs for English constituencies
Female members of the Parliament of the United Kingdom for English constituencies
21st-century British women politicians
UK MPs 2010–2015
UK MPs 2015–2017
UK MPs 2017–2019
UK MPs 2019–present
21st-century English women
21st-century English people
Commanders of the Order of the British Empire